Brian Donovan is an American voice actor. Donovan is best known for his role of Rock Lee from the critically acclaimed Naruto series. He has reprised his role of Rock Lee in Naruto: Shippuden and in 2010, he was cast as the voice of Salty in Alpha and Omega and its sequel. Donovan is also known as the lead role of Davis Motomiya from Digimon Adventure 02.

Biography
Donovan was set to reprise his role as Davis Motomiya in Digimon Adventure: Last Evolution Kizuna. Due to the events of the COVID-19 pandemic and a fault in his home studio, however, the role was instead recast to Griffin Burns.

Filmography

Animation/anime roles 
 A.T.O.M. – Ollie Sharker, Rayza
 Boruto: Naruto Next Generations - Rock Lee
 Digimon Adventure 02 – Davis Motomiya
  Digimon Tamers – Narrator/Kai Urazoe
 Digimon Frontier – Terou, Mushroomon
 Flint the Time Detective – Tony Goodman, Monk
 Naruto – Rock Lee
 Naruto: Shippuden – Rock Lee
 Rurouni Kenshin – Yutaro Tsukayama
 Vampire Princess Miyu – Boy in Swamp (ep. 10)
 The Zeta Project – Rudy

Movie roles 
 Alpha and Omega – Salty
 Digimon: The Movie – Davis Motomiya
 Digimon Adventure 02: Revenge of Diaboromon – Davis Motomiya
 Naruto the Movie 3: Guardians of the Crescent Moon Kingdom – Rock Lee
 Naruto: Shippūden the Movie – Rock Lee
 Naruto Shippuden 3: Inheritors of the Will of Fire – Rock Lee
 The Last: Naruto the Movie – Rock Lee
 Boruto: Naruto the Movie – Rock Lee

Other roles 
 Digimon Rumble Arena - Davis Motomiya
 Jetix – Promo/Commercial Announcer
 Mighty Me - Training Camp – Creator/Show's Host

References

External links

Living people
American male voice actors
Year of birth missing (living people)